John Arthur Lindegren (October 13, 1911 – May 23, 1981) is an American competition swimmer who represented the United States at the 1936 Summer Olympics in Berlin, Germany.  Lindegren finished seventh in the men's 100-meter freestyle with a time of 59.9 seconds in the event final.

External links
 
 

1911 births
1981 deaths
American male freestyle swimmers
Olympic swimmers of the United States
Swimmers from Los Angeles
Swimmers at the 1936 Summer Olympics